Ibad Movsum oghlu Huseynov is an Azerbaijani military man, scout, National Hero of Azerbaijan, and commander of the reconnaissance-sabotage group. In 1990–1994 he took part in the first Karabakh War.

Biography

Early years and military service
Ibad Huseynov was born in 1970 in Khojavend, Azerbaijan.

In 1988–1990 years served in the Soviet Army. While in the army he organized the uprising against the soviet leadership after Soviet aggression to Baku. Demanded to withdraw Russian troops from Baku and rejected to obey the soviet chain of command.

First Karabakh War 
During the first Karabakh War Ibad Huseynov killed an Armenian soldier, who he claimed was the Armenian national hero Monte Melkonian, which is false.

On October 22, 2012 General Talib Mammadov stated:

Awards 
In 1994 he was awarded “Azerbaijani Flag” order. On 9 December 2020, the President of Azerbaijan, Ilham Aliyev awarded Huseynov with the title of National Hero of Azerbaijan.

References

External links
 Fan site of Ibad Huseynov

1970 births
Azerbaijani military personnel
Azerbaijani military personnel of the Nagorno-Karabakh War
Living people
National Heroes of Azerbaijan
Recipients of the Azerbaijani Flag Order
People from Khojavend District